Sir James (de) Lindsay of Crawford (died 1358) was a Scottish feudal lord and politician.

Life 
Sir James de Lindsay was Lord of Crawford and Kirkmichael. He had been a hostage for King David II in 1351, and appears first in Parliament in 1357. He was appointed an ambassador to England as Dominus de Crawford in 1357, but died before 11 November 1358.

Marriage 
He married Egidia, daughter of Walter, Steward of Scotland, and half-sister of Robert II of Scotland. A papal dispensation for this marriage was granted at Avignon on 3 Ides of April 1346, which describes the spouse as within the third and fourth degree on the father's side, and in the fourth degree on the mother's. A strong inference thus arises that Sir James's grandmother, wife of Sir Alexander, was daughter to the Steward. Lady Egidia de Lindsay, as she was always afterwards styled, was married secondly, after October 1357, to Sir Hugh of Eglinton, and thirdly (contract October 1378), to Sir James Douglas of Dalkeith.

Issue 
Sir James and Egidia had issue:

 Sir James, only son and heir.
 Isabel, married before 13 July 1369, to Sir John de Maxwell, who survived her.
 Elizabeth, married to Sir Henry de Prestoun.

Notes

References

Sources 

 

Attribution:

 Paul, James Balfour (1906). The Scots Peerage. Vol. 3. Edinburgh: David Douglas. p. 11. 

1358 deaths
14th-century Scottish military personnel